Salām bin Abī 'l-Huqayq or Abu Rafi was a Jewish poet of early 7th century Arabia who financed and assisted the Pagan tribes who were fighting Muhammad and his followers, the muslims. 

He was killed in the Expedition of 'Abdullah ibn 'Atik after composed satirical verse (hija') about Muhammad and other early Muslim leaders.  

When men of the Banu Aus assassinated  Ka'b ibn al-Ashraf, some Khazraj tribesman including Abdullah ibn Unays went to Muhammad and received his permission to kill Sallam.

Muhammad ibn Jarir al-Tabari describes the assassination thus:

When they got to Khaybar they went to Sallam’s house by night, having locked every door in the settlement on the inhabitants.  Now he was in an upper chamber of his to which a ladder led up.  They mounted this until they came to the door and asked to be allowed to come in.  His wife came out and asked who they were and they told her that they were Arabs in search of supplies. She told them that their man was here and that they could come in.
When we entered we bolted the door of the room on her and ourselves fearing lest something should come between us and him.  His wife shrieked and warned him of us, so we ran at him with our swords as he was on his bed . . . . When we had smitten him with our swords Abdullah bin Unays bore down with his sword into his belly until it went right through him.

Sallam was the brother of al-Rabi ibn Abu al-Huqayq and the uncle of the latter's sons, who included Kenana ibn al-Rabi.

Sunni hadith

Abu Rafi's assassination is mentioned in many Sunni Hadith:

Resources
al-Tabari, The History of Al-Tabari: Volume 8, Michael Fishbein, tr. (Albany: State University of New York Press, 1997), 482–483.

See also
List of expeditions of Muhammad

Notes

Assassinated Jews
Banu Nadir
Medieval Jewish poets
7th-century Arabian Jews
624 deaths
Opponents of Muhammad
Year of birth unknown